The Columbia Borough School District is a diminutive, urban, public school district serving the Borough of Columbia in Lancaster County, Pennsylvania. Columbia Borough School District encompasses approximately 2 square miles. According to 2000 federal census data, it serves a resident population of 10,311.It is a member of Lancaster-Lebanon Intermediate Unit (IU) 13.

The district operates four schools: Park Elementary School, Columbia Middle School -Taylor Campus, Columbia Middle School -Hill Campus, and  Columbia High School.

See also 
 Official website

References 

School districts in Lancaster County, Pennsylvania